Christian Friedrich Zincke (1683–5 – 24 March 1767) was a German miniature painter active in England in the 18th century.

Life 
He was born in Dresden and died in Lambeth (now London). He apprenticed his father and also studied painting. In 1706 he came to London to work at Charles Boit's studio, and when Boit left for France eight years later Zincke inherited many of his fashionable clients. He went on to become the most successful enamel painter of his era.

Suffering from poor eyesight in the later 1740s, he passed on his business to James Deacon.

Painting techniques 
Zincke painted using existing portraits for reference, but also painted from life. To create skin tones he used a stipple technique of tiny red dots, sometimes described as 'measles'.

Notes

Bibliography

External links 

Works by him at the National Portrait Gallery
Image of Zincke and his wife

1683 births
1767 deaths
18th-century German painters
18th-century German male artists
German male painters
Portrait miniaturists
German emigrants to the Kingdom of Great Britain